

Crown
Head of State - Queen Elizabeth II

Federal government
Governor General - Adrienne Clarkson

Cabinet
Prime Minister -  Jean Chrétien
Deputy Prime Minister - Herb Gray
Minister of Finance - Paul Martin
Minister of Foreign Affairs - Lloyd Axworthy then John Manley
Minister of National Defence - Art Eggleton
Minister of Health - Allan Rock
Minister of Industry - John Manley then Brian Tobin
Minister of Heritage - Sheila Copps
Minister of Intergovernmental Affairs - Stéphane Dion
Minister of the Environment - David Anderson
Minister of Justice - Anne McLellan
Minister of Transport - David Collenette
Minister of Citizenship and Immigration - Elinor Caplan
Minister of Fisheries and Oceans - Herb Dhaliwal
Minister of Agriculture and Agri-Food - Lyle Vanclief
Minister of Public Works and Government Services - Alfonso Gagliano
Minister of Human Resources Development - Jane Stewart
Minister of Natural Resources - Ralph Goodale

Members of Parliament
See: 36th Canadian parliament, 37th Canadian parliament

Party leaders
Liberal Party of Canada -  Jean Chrétien
Reform Party of Canada (dissolved March 25) - Preston Manning
Canadian Alliance (formed March 27) - Deborah Grey (interim) then Stockwell Day
Bloc Québécois - Gilles Duceppe
New Democratic Party- Alexa McDonough
Progressive Conservative Party of Canada - Joe Clark

Supreme Court Justices
Chief Justice: Antonio Lamer then Beverley McLachlin
Frank Iacobucci
John C. Major
Michel Bastarache
William Ian Corneil Binnie
Louise Arbour
Louis LeBel (appointed to replace Lamer)
Claire L'Heureux-Dubé
Charles D. Gonthier

Other
Speaker of the House of Commons - Gilbert Parent
Governor of the Bank of Canada - Gordon Thiessen
Chief of the Defence Staff - General Maurice Baril

Provinces

Premiers
Premier of Alberta - Ralph Klein
Premier of British Columbia - Dan Miller then Ujjal Dosanjh
Premier of Manitoba - Gary Doer
Premier of New Brunswick - Bernard Lord
Premier of Newfoundland - Brian Tobin then Beaton Tulk
Premier of Nova Scotia - John Hamm
Premier of Ontario - Mike Harris
Premier of Prince Edward Island - Pat Binns
Premier of Quebec - Lucien Bouchard
Premier of Saskatchewan - Roy Romanow
Premier of the Northwest Territories - James Antoine then Stephen Kakfwi
Premier of Nunavut - Paul Okalik
Premier of Yukon - Piers McDonald then Pat Duncan

Lieutenant-governors
Lieutenant-Governor of Alberta - Bud Olson then Lois Hole
Lieutenant-Governor of British Columbia - Garde Gardom
Lieutenant-Governor of Manitoba - Peter Liba
Lieutenant-Governor of New Brunswick - Marilyn Trenholme Counsell
Lieutenant-Governor of Newfoundland and Labrador - Arthur Maxwell House
Lieutenant-Governor of Nova Scotia - James Kinley then Myra Freeman
Lieutenant-Governor of Ontario - Hilary Weston
Lieutenant-Governor of Prince Edward Island - Gilbert Clements
Lieutenant-Governor of Quebec - Lise Thibault
Lieutenant-Governor of Saskatchewan - Jack Wiebe then Lynda Haverstock

Mayors
Toronto - Mel Lastman
Montreal - Pierre Bourque
Vancouver - Philip Owen
Ottawa - Jim Watson
Victoria - Alan Lowe

Religious leaders
Roman Catholic Bishop of Quebec -  Archbishop Maurice Couture
Roman Catholic Bishop of Montreal -  Cardinal Archbishop Jean-Claude Turcotte
Roman Catholic Bishops of London - Bishop John Michael Sherlock
Moderator of the United Church of Canada - Bill Phipps then Marion Pardy

See also
1999 Canadian incumbents
Events in Canada in 2000
2001 Canadian incumbents
 Governmental leaders in 2000
 Canadian incumbents by year

2000
Incumbents
Canadian incumbents
Canadian leaders